The blackcap illadopsis (Illadopsis cleaveri) is a species of bird in the family Pellorneidae. It is native to areas surrounding the Gulf of Guinea (including Bioko island). Its natural habitat is subtropical or tropical moist lowland forest.

References

blackcap illadopsis
Birds of the Gulf of Guinea
Birds of the African tropical rainforest
blackcap illadopsis
Taxonomy articles created by Polbot